The Scottish First Division season 1981–82 was won by Motherwell by ten points over nearest rival Kilmarnock.

League table

Promotion

Motherwell and Kilmarnock finished 1st and second respectively and were promoted to the 1982–83 Scottish Premier Division.

Relegation

East Stirlingshire and Queen of the South F.C. finished 13th and 14th respectively and were relegated to the 1982–83 Scottish Second Division.

References 

 Scottish Football Archive

2
Scottish First Division seasons
Scot